John Bogers (born 3 January 1964) is a Dutch former professional racing cyclist. He rode in the 1987 Tour de France.

References

External links
 

1964 births
Living people
Dutch male cyclists
People from Cranendonck
Cyclists from North Brabant